Encheloclarias tapeinopterus is a species of airbreathing catfish endemic to Indonesia where it is only known from Bangka and Sumatra.  This species reaches a length of 12.4 cm (4.9 inches) TL.

Sources
 
 

Encheloclarias
Freshwater fish of Sumatra
Fish described in 1852
Taxa named by Pieter Bleeker
Taxonomy articles created by Polbot